Manchester Airport High Speed Station is a planned High Speed 2 station at Manchester Airport, on the southern boundary of Manchester, England, next to Junction 5 of the M56 motorway on the northern side of the airport  north-west of Manchester Airport railway station. Manchester Airport is the busiest airport in the UK outside London and offers more destinations than any other British airport. An airport station was recommended by local authorities during the consultation stage. The government agreed in January 2013 for an airport station, but only on the basis that private investment was involved, such as funding from the Manchester Airports Group to build the station. The government approved the scheme in November 2016.

If the station is built, journey times from London Euston to Manchester Airport have been estimated at between 59minutes and 63minutes. Additionally, the high speed service will be less than 10minutes from Manchester Piccadilly to the airport – down from 20minutes at present on the congested Styal Line which is used by a mix of commuter, express and freight services and susceptible to delays.

History
In 2020, revised plans were released that saw the number of platforms increased from two to four.

Metrolink tram stop

Current proposals do not detail passenger interchange facilities, but indicate that various options are being considered to integrate the new station with existing transport networks, including extending the Manchester Metrolink tram line to serve the HS2 station directly. 

Transport for Greater Manchester has proposed that the Metrolink Airport Line — which currently terminates at Manchester Airport station — be extended via a new "western loop" around Wythenshawe. This proposed tram line which would cross the M56 motorway via the Thorley Lane Bridge, with an HS2 interchange stop at Davenport Green, before looping around via Wythenshawe Hospital. Local politicians have begun lobbying central government for political support for this extension scheme, which is currently unfunded.

Revised proposals published in 2020 include provision for an east-west tram line that serves this station.

Services

Current service proposals will see five trains per hour north to Manchester Piccadilly, three trains per hour south to Old Oak Common and London Euston (one service additionally calls at Birmingham Interchange), and two trains south to Birmingham Curzon Street. The station is also planned to be an intermediate stop on the proposed Northern Powerhouse Rail line.

References

External links
Route section map and profile

High Speed 2
Railway stations in Manchester
Proposed railway stations in England
Manchester Airport
Proposed Manchester Metrolink tram stops